Kevin John Gausman (born January 6, 1991), nicknamed "Gaus", is an American professional baseball pitcher for the Toronto Blue Jays of Major League Baseball (MLB). He previously played for the Baltimore Orioles, Atlanta Braves, Cincinnati Reds, and San Francisco Giants. Before his professional career, Gausman attended Louisiana State University (LSU) and played college baseball for the LSU Tigers, with whom he was an All-American. The Orioles selected him in the first round (4th overall) of the 2012 MLB draft. He made his MLB debut in 2013. He was an All-Star in 2021.

Amateur career
Gausman attended Grandview High School in Aurora, Colorado, where he played for the school's baseball team as a pitcher. In his sophomore year he pitched to a 5–2 win–loss record with a 2.79 earned run average (ERA). In his junior year, he was 7-2 with a 2.15 ERA, and in 2010, his senior year, he was 9–2 with a 3.12 ERA. As a batter, playing for his high school varsity, he hit .322/.431/.576 with seven home runs and 40 runs batted in (RBIs) in 145 plate appearances.

The Los Angeles Dodgers selected Gausman in the sixth round of the 2010 Major League Baseball Draft, but he did not sign. He attended Louisiana State University (LSU), where he played college baseball for the LSU Tigers baseball team. In 2011, he played collegiate summer baseball with the Harwich Mariners of the Cape Cod Baseball League. In 2012, as a sophomore at LSU, he was 12–2 (leading the Southeastern Conference in wins) with a 2.77 ERA in 18 games (17 starts) and 135 strikeouts (leading the Conference) in 123.2 innings. Gausman pitched in both Games 1 and 2 of the Baton Rouge Super Regional, coming out in relief in the completion of the rain-delayed first game and earning a win, but taking a loss in the second game as LSU suffered a historic upset at the hands of Stony Brook. He was an All-American in 2012 at LSU.

Professional career

Baltimore Orioles

The Baltimore Orioles selected Gausman in the first round, with the fourth overall selection, in the 2012 Major League Baseball draft. He signed with the Orioles for a signing bonus of $4.32 million on July 13, 2012.

Gausman started the 2013 season with the Double-A Bowie Baysox until the Orioles promoted him to the major leagues to make his debut in Toronto against the Blue Jays on May 23, 2013. In his debut against the Blue Jays, Gausman pitched five innings and allowed seven hits, four runs, and two walks, also adding five strikeouts. Gausman picked up the loss as the Orioles fell 12–6 to the Blue Jays. On June 14, Gausman was optioned to the Triple-A Norfolk Tides. He was recalled on June 24. On June 28, Gausman earned his first Major League win, against the New York Yankees, pitching in relief of T. J. McFarland, going  innings, striking out four and allowing no walks and three hits. He was optioned back to Norfolk on July 10. He was again recalled from the Norfolk Tides on August 28 and earned his second big league win on September 1, also against the Yankees, but at Yankee Stadium.

2014 season
On June 7, 2014, Gausman earned his first win as a starting pitcher, going seven innings against the Oakland Athletics, allowing only one run, walking one, and striking out six. Following the best outing of his young career, Gausman pitched against the AL East leading Toronto Blue Jays where he went six innings, again allowing one run and striking out three. In the 2014 postseason, Gausman pitched out of the bullpen for the Orioles. Gausman pitched eight innings in three relief appearances, posting a 1.13 ERA and an 0.75 WHIP. The Orioles would sweep the Tigers in the ALDS before being swept in the ALCS by the Kansas City Royals.

Gausman finished the 2014 campaign having made 20 starts, with one complete game (five innings, due to rain), posting a 3.57 ERA and a 7–7 win–loss record.

2015 season
Gausman made 25 appearances in 2015 (17 starts). He posted a moderate 4.25 ERA, but struck out a career-high 103 batters, averaging 8.3 K/9. He posted a 4–7 record, as the Orioles finished 81–81 and didn't make the playoffs.

2016 season

Gausman started the 2016 season on the DL, but returned ready to prove he was at his best. He made his season debut on April 25 against the Rays, earning a tough loss after going five innings and giving up only one run on three hits. He earned a no decision in his next start as the Orioles lost 8–7 against the White Sox. Gausman went six innings, allowing three runs (two earned). His next start was the best of his career, as he pitched eight shutout innings, allowing only three hits, no walks, and striking out four batters. He earned a tough no decision, as the Orioles would eventually win the game 1–0 in the tenth inning.

Gausman pitched to a 4.15 ERA in 15 pre-All Star Break starts. He had a tough 1–6 record, as his run support was very low.

On August 28, Gausman pitched 7 scoreless innings against the Yankees, raising his scoreless innings streak to 13 innings. In his next start against the Yankees, Gausman pitched six shutout innings, raising his scoreless innings streak to 19 innings. He fanned eight batters and won his career-high fourth straight start. Gausman also tied his career high with his seventh win of the year, while lowering his ERA to 3.58. He extended the scoreless innings streak to 21 against the Tigers, before allowing a run in the second inning of a 4–3 loss. Following this start, he threw eight scoreless innings in a 1–0 victory over the Red Sox. He improved to 8–10 on the year and lowered his ERA to 3.43.

Gausman finished the year 11–12, despite pitching to a 3.61 ERA, due to low run support. He pitched a career-high in innings, and struck out a career-high 174 batters. His 8.716 K/9 and his 3.706 K/BB were both 10th in the AL.

2017 season
On March 28, 2017, Gausman was named the Orioles' Opening Day starting pitcher for the first time in his career. He pitched 5.1 innings on Opening Day, allowing two runs on five hits and four walks, while also striking out four batters. Gausman earned the no decision. On May 3, Gausman was ejected for the first time in his Major League career after hitting Xander Bogaerts with a pitch. On July 29, Gausman pitched the longest outing of his career against the Texas Rangers, going 8 shutout innings while striking out eight batters and earning the victory.

For the season, he led the league with 34 starts, and his 179 strikeouts and 186.7 innings pitched were both 10th in the AL. He had the lowest percentage of balls pulled against him (33.3%) among major league pitchers. His 8.630 K/9 was 10th in the AL.

2018 season
Before the 2018 season, Gausman changed from his old number of 39 to 34, in honor of the late former Toronto Blue Jays and Philadelphia Phillies pitcher Roy Halladay. On April 23, in a start against the Cleveland Indians, Gausman threw the 90th immaculate inning in MLB history, striking out three batters in one inning on just nine pitches.

Atlanta Braves
On July 31, 2018, Gausman along with Darren O'Day, was traded to the Atlanta Braves in exchange for minor leaguers Brett Cumberland, Jean Carlos Encarnacion, Evan Phillips, Bruce Zimmermann, and international signing money.

During spring training in 2019, Gausman dealt with a sore shoulder. He began the season rehabilitating in the minor leagues, and made his season debut on April 5.

On May 3, 2019, Gausman was ejected from a game against the Miami Marlins by umpire Jeff Nelson for throwing behind José Ureña. He and Ureña had last faced each other on August 15, 2018, when Ureña hit the Braves' Ronald Acuña with a pitch. Major League Baseball fined and suspended Gausman for five games. Gausman initially appealed the suspension. On May 12, Gausman dropped his appeal. In 16 starts, he was 3–7 with a career-high 6.19 ERA. and struck out 85 batters in 80 innings.

Cincinnati Reds
On August 5, 2019, the Cincinnati Reds claimed Gausman off waivers from the Braves. With the Reds, Gausman became a reliever. In a relief appearance against the St. Louis Cardinals on August 18, Gausman struck out all six batters he faced, including tossing his second career immaculate inning.

In 2019 with Cincinnati he was 0–2 with a 4.03 ERA in 15 games (one start) in which he threw  innings, walked five batters, and struck out 29 batters. Gausman was non-tendered on December 2, 2019, and became a free agent.

San Francisco Giants

2020 season
On December 10, 2019, Gausman signed a one-year $9 million contract with the San Francisco Giants.

During the shortened 2020 season, Gausman had a major bounce-back season, in which he was 3–3 with a 3.62 ERA and 15 walks and 79 strikeouts in  innings in 12 games (10 starts), and a career-low 1.106 WHIP along with a career-high 11.9 K/9. On November 11, 2020, Gausman accepted a qualifying $18.9 million offer from the Giants.

2021 season
Gausman was the 2021 Opening Day starter for the Giants. He was named the National League Pitcher of the Month for the month of May 2021. He won five games during the month, maintained an ERA of 0.73, and allowed an opponent slash line of .165/.201/.241. He was a 2021 National League All Star.

On September 17, 2021, Gausman was on the bench as the Giants took on the Braves. When the Giants ran out of position players, having already pinch-hit five times, Gausman, slashing .184/.212/.184 as a batter, was called upon to pinch-hit in the bottom of the 11th with the bases loaded and one out, and the game tied 5–5. On a full count, he hit his first career sacrifice fly, scoring Brandon Crawford to win the game. Gausman described it as "the coolest thing I've ever done in my entire career".

In the regular season in 2021, Gausman was 14-6 with a 2.81 ERA (6th in the NL), in a National League-leading 33 starts he pitched 192 innings (5th) and had 227 strikeouts (4th). His 14 wins and 10.641 K/9 were fifth in the league, and his .700 win-loss percentage was sixth, as he gave up 7.031 hits per 9 innings (sixth).

Toronto Blue Jays
On December 1, 2021, Gausman signed a five-year, $110 million contract with the Toronto Blue Jays. In 2022, Gausman made 31 starts during the regular season with a 12–10 win-loss record and a 3.35 ERA. He also made one postseason start for the Blue Jays during the Wild Card Series against the Seattle Mariners.

Pitching style

In 2020, he increased the average velocity and spin rate (as compared to 2019) on his four-seam fastball by simply bending his right leg, while tucking the front foot at the level of the back leg's knee.

Personal life
In December 2016, Gausman married Taylor North, and they have two daughters.

Gausman grew up a Colorado Rockies fan. He is the son of former college football official Clair Gausman.

References

External links

LSU Tigers bio

1991 births
Living people
People from Centennial, Colorado
Baseball players from Colorado
Major League Baseball pitchers
Baltimore Orioles players
Atlanta Braves players
Cincinnati Reds players
San Francisco Giants players
Toronto Blue Jays players
LSU Tigers baseball players
Harwich Mariners players
Aberdeen IronBirds players
Frederick Keys players
Bowie Baysox players
Norfolk Tides players
Gwinnett Stripers players